Amata shirakii is a moth of the subfamily Arctiinae. It was described by Jinhaku Sonan in 1941. It is found in Taiwan.

References

shirakii